Better Never Than Late is the sixth studio album by the New Zealand band The Exponents, released in May 1997. The album reached #3 on the New Zealand music charts and initial copies were released with a bonus live CD. The album was made available digitally in May 2013.

Track listing
"One In A Lifetime" (Luck/Barraclough)
"Change Your Mind" (Luck)
"Shouldn't Be Allowed" (Barraclough)
"Close" (Luck)
"Come And Go" (Luck)
"Only You Are" (Luck)
"You Started Me Thinking" (Luck)
"Happy Today" (Luck/Barraclough)
"Help Me" (Luck/Rawlinson)
"Smiths Getting Through" (Luck)
"Infinity" (Luck/Barraclough)
"Everything at All" (Luck)

Bonus live CD
"Erotic"
"Do You Feel In Love"
"Nameless Girl"
"Sink Like A Stone"
"Rocks"
"You Started Me Thinking"
"Sometimes"
"Victoria"

Members
Jordan Luck (vocals)
David Gent (bass guitar)
Harry (drums)
Dave Barraclough (guitar)

Credits
Produced by Eddie Rayner & The Exponents
Engineered: Simon Sheridan<
Additional engineering: Matt Tait
Assistant engineers: Stuart Wordsworth and Chris Bolster
Mastered by Toby at Sony Huntingwood, Australia
Cover photo: Kieran Scott
Design: The Family

Charts

References 

1997 albums
The Exponents albums